Ailsa Jane Carmichael, Lady Carmichael (born 26 November 1969) is a Scottish advocate and judge who has served as a Senator of the College of Justice since 2016.

Early life 
Ailsa Jane Carmichael was born on 28 November 1969 in Paisley, Renfrewshire, the eldest of two daughters to Ian Henry Buist Carmichael and Jean Cowie Carmichael (née Davidson). Her father was an advocate and worked for the Scottish Legal Action Group. Carmichael's younger sister Heather is an advocate, working in Westwater Advocates.

In 1986, after leaving Hutchesons' Grammar School from fifth year, Carmichael attended the University of Glasgow School of Law. She studied abroad at the Erasmus University in Rotterdam and worked in law firms in Amsterdam. In 1990, she graduated with an LLB (hons) (Upper Second Class specialising in Comparative Law) and gained a Diploma in Legal Practice the following year.

Legal career 
After receiving her Diploma in Legal Practice in 1991, she undertook a bar traineeship with Simpson & Marwick in Edinburgh after which she was admitted as an advocate in 1993, and devilled for sheriff J.A. Baird and for S.J. MacGibbon. From 2000 to 2008 she was standing junior counsel to the Home Office in Scotland, appearing in many judicial reviews and statutory appeals relating to immigration and asylum. She was junior counsel to the Fingerprint Inquiry, which investigated the use of fingerprint evidence in the case of Detective Constable Shirley McKie.

She took silk in 2008.

Carmichael specialises in public and administrative law. She served as an advocate depute, as a member of the Mental Health Tribunal for Scotland, and as a part-time sheriff.

From 2011 to 2014, Carmichael was a tutor in human rights at the Diploma in Legal Practice course at the University of Edinburgh.

Senator of the College of Justice 
On 11 May 2016, it was announced that Carmichael would be one of five new judges appointed to the College of Justice, the others being John Beckett, Alistair Clark, Frank Mulholland, and Andrew Stewart. Mulholland's appointment was not due to take effect until later in 2016, after the retirement of another judge. The other four appointees were to fill existing vacancies. Beckett, Clark and Stewart were all installed in May, however Carmichael's installation came a month later, on 30 June 2016. She took the judicial title Lady Carmichael.

Personal life 
In 1997 she married Paul Barnaby, and together they had a daughter and son. Their marriage was dissolved in 2008. In 2010 she married Pino Di Emidio with whom she has a daughter. Carmichael enjoys music, cinema, literature, cooking and travel.

See also
Scots law
Courts of Scotland

References

External links 
 Scottish Judiciary: The Hon Lady Carmichael (Ailsa Carmichael QC)

Living people
Members of the Faculty of Advocates
Scottish King's Counsel
21st-century King's Counsel
Alumni of the University of Glasgow
21st-century Scottish judges
Scottish sheriffs
Scottish women judges
Senators of the College of Justice
1969 births
21st-century women judges